The 2008 Akron Zips football team represented the University of Akron in the 2008 NCAA Division I FBS football season.  Akron competed as a member of the Mid-American Conference (MAC) and played in the East Division.

Before the season
2007 starter Reggie Corner was selected 114th overall in the fourth round of the 2008 NFL Draft. He is the 15th player from Akron to be selected in the draft, and he is the fifth-highest historically. Four other players signed with professional teams in the National Football League.  These players are:
Jabari Arthur with the Kansas City Chiefs,
Davanzo Tate with the New York Jets,
Nate Robinson with the New York Giants, and
Kris Kasparek with the Miami Dolphins.

Six different Akron players made their ways to Preseason All-MAC Teams. Five players were selected each for the teams published by MAC Report Online and Athlon. On the list published by MAC Report Online, Almondo Sewell was named First-Team Defense, and Bryan Williams as well as Andre Jones were named First-Team Specialists. Chris Kemme and Ryan Bain were named Second-Team Offense and Defense, respectively.

Schedule

Game summaries

Wisconsin
at Camp Randall Stadium, Madison, Wisconsin

Scoring Summary

1st Quarter
10:37 WIS Graham 3-yard pass from Evridge (Welch kick) 7-0 WIS
7:20 WIS Hill 2-yard run (Welch kick) 14-0 WIS

2nd Quarter
14:52 WIS Welch 32-yard field goal 17-0 WIS
10:44 AKR Poindexter 3-yard pass from Jacquemain (Iveljic kick) 17-7 WIS
0:02 AKR Iveljic 26-yard field goal 17-10 WIS

3rd Quarter
10:00 WIS Hill 1-yard run (Welch kick) 24-10 WIS
6:20 WIS Brown 2-yard run (Welch kick) 31-10 WIS

4th Quarter
11:48 WIS Clay 9-yard run (Welch kick) 38-10 WIS
0:38 AKR Owen 11-yard pass from Jacquemain (Iveljic kick) 38-17 WIS

Syracuse
at the Carrier Dome, Syracuse, New York

Scoring Summary

1st Quarter
11:39 AKR Jones 33-yard pass from Jacquemain (Iveljic kick) 7-0 AKR
1:41 AKR Kennedy 35-yard run (Iveljic kick) 14-0 AKR

2nd Quarter
14:14 SYR Owen 32-yard pass from Dantley (Shadle kick) 14-7 AKR
7:35 AKR Allen 1-yard run (Iveljic kick) 21-7 AKR
2:17 SYR Brinkley 1-yard run (Shadle kick) 21-14 Akron
0:22 AKR Allen 1-yard run (Iveljic kick) 28-14 Akron

3rd Quarter
11:30 SYR Owen 4-yard pass from Dantley (Shadle kick) 28-21 Akron

4th Quarter
12:56 SYR Provo 15-yard pass from Dantley (Shadle kick) 28-28
7:28 AKR Jones 21-yard pass from Jacquemain (Iveljic kick) 35-28 Akron
2:43 AKR Poindexter 18-yard pass from Jacquemain (Iveljic kick) 42-28 Akron

Ball State
at the Rubber Bowl, Akron, Ohio

Scoring Summary

1st Quarter
12:26 BSU Orsbon 21-yard pass from Davis (McGarvey kick) 7-0 BSU
10:50 AKR Iveljic 34-yard field goal 7-3 BSU

2nd Quarter
13:32 BSU McGarvey 31-yard field goal 10-3 BSU
10:18 AKR Allen 5-yard run (Iveljic kick) 10-10
1:11 BSU Lewis 3-yard run (McGarvey kick) 17-10 BSU

3rd Quarter
9:26 BSU Baker 33-yard fumble recovery (McGarvey kick) 24-10 BSU
5:16 BSU Lewis 2-yard run (McGarvey kick) 31-10 BSU

4th Quarter
13:06 AKR Johnson 26-yard run (Iveljic kick) 31-17 BSU
10:17 BSU Hill 25-yard pass from Davis (McGarvey kick) 38-17 BSU
8:27 AKR Jones 13-yard pass from Jacquemain (Iveljic kick) 38-24 BSU
3:04 BSU McGarvey 32-yard field goal 41-24 BSU

Army
at Michie Stadium, West Point, New York

Scoring Summary

1st Quarter
7:21 AKR Iveljic 25-yard field goal 3-0 AKR

2nd Quarter
6:14 AKR Jones 25-yard pass from Jacquemain (Iveljic kick failed) 9-0 AKR
0:00 ARMY Campbell 36-yard field goal 9-3 AKR

3rd Quarter
8:22 AKR Iveljic 36-yard field goal 12-3 AKR

4th Quarter
8:22 AKR Kennedy 1-yard run (Iveljic kick) 19-3 AKR
4:02 AKR Iveljic 37-yard field goal 22-3 AKR

Cincinnati
at the Rubber Bowl, Akron, Ohio

Scoring Summary

1st Quarter
10：47 CIN Gilyard 14-yard pass from Pike (Rogers kick) 7-0 CIN
4:02 AKR Iveljic 26-yard field goal 7-3 CIN

2nd Quarter
0:09 AKR Bowser 7-yard pass from Jacquemain (Iveljic kick blocked) 9-7 AKR

3rd Quarter
13:05 CIN Gilyard 67-yard pass from Pike (Rogers kick) 14-9 CIN

4th Quarter
14:13 AKR Kennedy 1-yard run (2PAT failed) 15-14 AKR
7:45 CIN Rogers 48-yard field goal 17-15 CIN

Kent State
at Dix Stadium, Kent, Ohio

Scoring Summary

1st Quarter
13:09 AKR Jones 29-yard pass from Jacquemain (Iveljic kick) 7-0 AKR
3:53 KENT Thompson 1-yard pass from Edelman (Reed kick) 7-7
0:06 AKR Iveljic 33-yard field goal 10-7 AKR

2nd Quarter
10:55 KENT Bayes 14-yard pass from Edelman (Reed kick) 14-10 KENT
3:06 KENT Terry 1-yard run (Reed kick) 21-10 KENT

3rd Quarter
8:45 AKR Kennedy 1-yard run (Iveljic kick) 21-17 KENT

4th Quarter
1:28 AKR Bowser 24-yard pass from Jacquemain (Iveljic kick) 24-21 AKR
0:00 KENT Reed 32-yard field goal 24-24

Overtime
OT KENT Reed 34-yard field goal 27-24 KENT
OT AKR Iveljic 32-yard field goal 27-27
2OT AKR Iveljic 25-yard field goal 30-27 AKR

Bowling Green
at the Rubber Bowl, Akron, Ohio

Scoring Summary

1st Quarter
1:05 AKR Kennedy 3-yard run (Iveljic kick) 7-0 AKR

2nd Quarter
5:54 AKR Bowser 37-yard pass from Jacquemain (Iveljic kick) 14-0 AKR
3:50 BGSU Parks 34-yard pass from Sheehan (Vrvilo kick) 14-7 AKR
2:58 AKR Kennedy 19-yard run (Iveljic kick) 21-7 AKR
0:42 BGSU Partridge 8-yard pass from Sheehan (Vrvilo kick) 21-14 AKR

3rd Quarter
10:06 AKR Iveljic 47-yard field goal 24-14 AKR
5:00 AKR Iveljic 26-yard field goal 27-14 AKR

4th Quarter
13:04 Sheehan 19-yard run (Vrvilo kick) 27-21 AKR
11:38 BGSU Sheidler 5-yard pass from Anthony Turner (Vrvilo kick) 28-27 BGSU
7:47 AKR Poindexter 13-yard pass from Jacquemain (2PAT failed) 33-28 AKR
4:52 BGSU Partridge 21-yard pass from Sheehan (2PAT failed) 34-33 BGSU
2:20 Vrvilo 44-yard field goal 37-33 BGSU

Eastern Michigan
at Rynearson Stadium, Ypsilanti, Michigan

Scoring Summary

1st Quarter
12:08 AKR Iveljic 26-yard field goal 3-0 AKR

2nd Quarter
12:16 AKR Jones 16-yard pass from Jacquemain (Iveljic kick) 10-0 AKR
9:29 EMU Blevins 3-yard run (Carithers kick) 10-7 AKR
9:21 AKR Jones 45-yard pass from Jacquemain (Iveljic kick) 17-7 AKR
4:17 EMU Jones 5-yard pass from Schmitt (Carithers kick) 17-14 AKR
2:51 AKR Kennedy 33-yard run (Iveljic kick) 24-14 AKR

3rd Quarter
9:06 EMU Blevins 1-yard run (Carithers kick) 24-21 AKR
7:42 AKR Kennedy 10-yard run (Iveljic kick) 31-21 AKR

4th Quarter
14:10 AKR Iveljic 27-yard field goal 34-21 AKR
5:31 EMU Sanders 19-yard pass from Schmitt (Carithers kick) 34-28 AKR
3:49 EMU Leduc 6-yard pass from Schmitt (Carithers kick) 35-34 EMU
0:14 AKR Kennedy 4-yard run (Kennedy rush) AKR 42-35

Toledo
at the Rubber Bowl, Akron, Ohio

Scoring Summary

1st Quarter
 11:39 AKR Bruce 23-yard pass from Jacquemain (Iveljic kick) 7-0 AKR
 9:58 AKR A. Williams blocked punt return (Iveljic kick) 14-0 AKR
 4:22 AKR Poindexter 19-yard pass from Jacquemain (Iveljic kick) 21-0 AKR
 0:04 TOL Steigerwald 28-yard field goal 21-3 AKR

2nd Quarter
 5:11 TOL Opelt 6-yard run (Steigerwald kick) 21-10 AKR
 0:02 AKR Iveljic 23-yard field goal 24-10 AKR

3rd Quarter
 12:19 TOL Stafford 22-yard pass from Opelt (Steigerwald kick blocked) 24-16 AKR
 12:19 AKR Lemon PAT return 26-16 AKR
 6:29 TOL Williams 8-yard pass from Opelt (Steigerwald kick) AKR 26-23
 3:04 AKR Miller 9-yard pass from Jacquemain (Iveljic kick) 33-23 AKR

4th Quarter
 12:51 AKR Kennedy 2-yard run (Iveljic kick) 40-23 AKR
 8:01 AKR A. Johnson 33-yard run (Iveljic kick) 47-23 AKR
 5:01 TOL Williams 16-yard pass from Opelt (Steigerwald kick) 47-30 AKR

Buffalo
at the Rubber Bowl, Akron, Ohio

Scoring Summary

1st Quarter
 9:36 UB Roosevelt 24-yard pass from Willy (Principe kick) 7-0 UB
 5:08 UB Principe 28-yard field goal 10-0 UB
 4:53 AKR Kennedy 57-yard pass from Jacquemain (Iveljic kick) 10-7 UB

2nd Quarter
 4:48 UB Starks 3-yard run (Principe kick) 17-7 UB
 0:08 AKR Iveljic 49-yard field goal 17-10 UB

3rd Quarter
 11:14 AKR Kennedy 24-yard run (Iveljic kick) 17-17

4th Quarter
 11:14 UB Starks 5-yard run (Principe kick) 24-17 UB
 0:23 Kennedy 1-yard run (Iveljic kick) 24-24

Overtime
 OT UB Willy 1-yard run (Principe kick) 31-24 UB
 OT AKR Miller 4-yard pass from Jacquemain (Iveljic kick) 31-31
 2OT AKR Iveljic 42-yard field goal 34-31 AKR
 2OT UB Principe 24-yard field goal 34-34
 3OT UB Starks 1-yard run (2PAT failed) 40-34 UB
 3OT AKR Kennedy 1-yard run (2PAT failed) 40-40
 4OT UB Principe 40-yard field goal 43-40 UB

Ohio
at Peden Stadium, Athens, Ohio

Scoring Summary

1st Quarter
 8:01 AKR Kennedy 3-yard run (Iveljic kick 7-0 AKR
 2:49 OHIO Brazill 66-yard punt return (Way kick) 7-7

2nd Quarter
 11:19 OHIO Price 4-yard pass from Jackson (Way kick) 14-7 OHIO
 6:42 AKR Jacquemain 9-yard run (Iveljic kick) 14-14
 2:45 OHIO Carter 23-yard pass from Jackson (Way kick) 21-14 Ohio
 1:18 AKR Bowser 60-yard pass from Jacquemain (Iveljic kick) 21-21
 1:01 OHIO Price 19-yard pass from Jackson (Way kick) 28-21 OHIO

3rd Quarter
 9:01 OHIO Price 25-yard pass from Jackson (Way kick) 35-21 OHIO

4th Quarter
 14:57 AKR Kennedy 1-yard run (Iveljic kick) 35-28 OHIO
 14:42 OHIO Garrett 97-yard kickoff return (Way kick) 42-28 OHIO
 8:08 AKR Kennedy 2-yard run (Iveljic kick) 42-35 OHIO
 2:12 AKR Kennedy 1-yard run (Iveljic kick) 42-42
 0:32 Carter 1-yard pass from Jackson (Way kick) 49-42 OHIO

Temple
at Lincoln Financial Field, Philadelphia, Pennsylvania

Scoring Summary

2nd Quarter
 9:08 TEM DiMichele 4-yard run (Brownell kick failed 6-0 TEM

3rd Quarter
 2:18 AKR Iveljic 24-yard field goal 6-3 TEM

4th Quarter
 10:15 AKR Iveljic 18-yard field goal 6-6
 7:49 TEM DiMichelle 4-yard run (Brownell kick) 13-6 TEM
 4:02 TEM Grigsby 3-yard run (Brownell kick) 20-6 TEM
 2:29 TEM Grigsby 9-yard run (Brownell kick) 27-6

Roster

Coaching staff
J.D. Brookhart - Head Coach
Bill Bleil - Assistant Head Coach / Tackles & Tight Ends
Joe Moorhead - Offensive Coordinator / Quarterbacks
Jim Fleming - Defensive Coordinator / Secondary
Brian Callahan - Offensive Line
 Dana Chambers - Defensive Line
Mike Dawson - Linebackers
Reno Ferri - Running Backs / Recruiting Coordinator
Emmanuel McDaniel - Cornerbacks
Mauro Monz - Wide Receivers

Statistics

Team

Scores by quarter

Offense

Rushing

Passing

Receiving

Defense

Special teams

References

Akron
Akron Zips football seasons
Akron Zips football